Thomas James Schuyler (born June 10, 1952, in Bethlehem, Pennsylvania) is an American songwriter. Schuyler wrote songs recorded by more than 200 various artists including "16th Avenue" for Lacy J. Dalton, "Love Will Turn You Around" for Kenny Rogers, and "A Long Line of Love" for Michael Martin Murphey.

In 1983, Schuyler signed to Capitol Records and released the album Brave Heart. Its title track was a No. 43 single on the Hot Country Singles (now Hot Country Songs) charts. Later, he founded the trio S-K-O (originally known as Schuyler, Knobloch & Overstreet) with J. Fred Knobloch and Paul Overstreet. S-K-O charted seven singles in the mid-1980s, including the Number One hit "Baby's Got a New Baby". Overstreet later assumed a solo career and the trio was renamed S-K-B when Craig Bickhardt replaced him.

After S-K-B disbanded, Schuyler continued to write songs, and was eventually made chairman of the Country Music Association. He also headed RCA Records' Nashville division from 1992 to 1995. In that role he signed singer Kenny Chesney, the band Lonestar and also had a significant role in launching the career of Martina McBride and Sara Evans. Schuyler continued to write songs for Almo-Irving Music, administered several music catalogs and recorded a few independent albums. He was inducted into the Nashville Songwriters Hall of Fame in 2011.

Schuyler is currently the Young Adult Minister at a church in Nashville and an adjunct instructor at Belmont University.

Songs written by Thom Schuyler

Discography

Albums

Singles

References

1952 births
American country singer-songwriters
Living people
Liberty High School (Bethlehem, Pennsylvania) alumni
Singer-songwriters from Pennsylvania
People from Bethlehem, Pennsylvania
S-K-O members
Country musicians from Pennsylvania